Fintan Warfield (born 1992) is an Irish Sinn Féin politician who has served as a Senator for the Cultural and Educational Panel since April 2016. As of 2017, he was the youngest senator in Ireland.

Early life and education
Warfield attended St Mac Dara's Community College. He was a Gaelic footballer for St Jude's, a sport he has also played with Dublin Devils F.C., as well as being a supporter of St Patrick's Athletic. At 17, Warfield moved to Galway where he graduated with a Bachelor of Arts in Film & Television from Galway-Mayo Institute of Technology (GMIT) in 2012. He moved back to Dublin upon graduation.

Career
Warfield was the Mayor of South Dublin County Council from 2014 to 2015, and is an openly gay LGBT activist. He donated 10% of his mayoral salary to a women's refuge, LGBT group BeLonG To and Citywise (known for providing youths with educational support in Jobstown).

Warfield was the first senator in the country to be elected in the 2016 Seanad elections, topping the poll on the Cultural and Educational Panel on 25 April 2016. He also won the most first preference votes of any candidate contesting the five vocational panel elections.

Since his election to the Seanad, he has tabled two legislative bills: The Electoral (Amendment) (Voting at 16) Bill 2016, which aimed to lower the voting age to sixteen in local and European elections; and the Gender Recognition (Amendment) Bill 2017, which aimed to give gender identity rights to non-binary and transgender young people.

He is the Sinn Féin Seanad Spokesperson on Youth affairs, LGBT rights and the Arts.

On 31 March 2020, Warfield was re-elected to Seanad Éireann following the 2020 election to the upper house.

In July 2020, Warfield made reports to the Garda Siochána following escalating online and offline homophobic harassment and abuse that started to extend to threats against members of his family. This came after he had made a speech in the Seanad in support of transgender rights, but also in the same time period as an extended bout of harassment against Green Party TD Roderic O'Gorman, who is also openly gay.

Personal life
A former full-time musician, he plays guitar and sings. He is a cousin of Derek Warfield and Brian Warfield (musicians with The Wolfe Tones) and performed with them, touring in the United States. He is on the board of the Civic Theatre.

References

External links
Fintan Warfield's page on the Sinn Féin website

1992 births
Living people
Alumni of Galway-Mayo Institute of Technology
Gay musicians
Gay politicians
Irish folk singers
Irish male guitarists
LGBT legislators in Ireland
LGBT mayors
Local councillors in South Dublin (county)
Mayors of places in the Republic of Ireland
Members of the 25th Seanad
Members of the 26th Seanad
Sinn Féin senators
St Jude's Gaelic footballers
21st-century guitarists
21st-century Irish male singers
21st-century Irish LGBT people